Debbie Lee Wesselmann is a novelist born in New York City.  She has lived in New Jersey, New Hampshire, Rhode Island, and Pennsylvania. She studied at Dartmouth College and Fairleigh Dickinson University, where she later also taught fiction writing.  Currently she teaches English at Lehigh University in Bethlehem, Pennsylvania.

Works 
 The Earth and Sky (1997) (collection of short stories)
 Trutor and the Balloonist (1997) (novel)
 Captivity (2008) (novel)

External links
 Official website
 Review in The New York Times of The Earth and Sky
 Article in The Philadelphia Inquirer on Trutor and the Balloonist
 Article in PennLive on Captivity

20th-century American novelists
21st-century American novelists
American women novelists
Living people
Dartmouth College alumni
Fairleigh Dickinson University alumni
Year of birth missing (living people)
20th-century American women writers
21st-century American women writers